Pelni (abbreviation of) is the national cargo and passenger shipping company of Indonesia. Its services network spans across the Indonesian archipelago. Mainly serving as connector between bigger cities and to remote islands, Pelni plays an important role in the Indonesian transport system.

Pelni is one of the few remaining economy-class long-distance passenger ship operators. Most of the world's well-known passenger ship companies have stopped their low-budget passenger services since the 1960s due to shifting trends towards air transport. Pelni's ability to survive is mostly due to monopolies on certain routes and government of Indonesia subsidies.

History 

Under the Dutch colonial rule, Indonesian inter-islands transportation was dominated by Koninklijke Paketvaart-Maatschappij (KPM), founded in 1888. KPM headquarter was in Amsterdam, but daily operations were controlled from Batavia, Dutch East Indies (now Jakarta).

As a newly independent republic in the late 1940s, Indonesian government decided to nationalize Dutch-owned companies. The Dutch refused to give away KPM, due to its strong position as a connector of the Indonesian archipelago. KPM also played an important role in transporting Dutch logistics and military supplies during the Indonesian National Revolution.

In response to Dutch refusal, on September 5, 1950, Indonesia founded PEPUSKA (Yayasan Penguasaan Pusat Kapal-kapal, Centrally-controlled Ships Foundation) that operates 8 ships with a total size of 4.800 Deadweight tonnage. However, due to a lack of experience and capital, PEPUSKA failed to takeover KPM's monopoly.

On April 28, 1952, PEPUSKA was dissolved. Pelni (now as a company, not a foundation) was founded on the same day, with the same fleet. To bring more power, Indonesian Eximbank provided funding to buy 45 new coaster ships from western European countries. While waiting for these new ships to be produced, Pelni rented various ships from many countries across the world. Pelni also used ships looted from Japan in World War 2. These strategies proved successful, as KPM suffered from declining market share and strike workers led by Sukarno's leftist doctrine. KPM discontinued its Indonesian operation on December 3, 1957.

Pelni achieved its golden era during the early 1980s to late 1990s. Under Suharto presidency with his Transmigration program, Pelni was the main transport to move people from Java and Sumatra to eastern region of Indonesia, because air transport facilities were still underdeveloped.

Pelni started to suffer in the 2000s, as air travel became cheaper. Some of its old ships even failed to sell to third parties, and maintaining these old ships was expensive. KM Kambuna (renamed ) and KM Rinjani (renamed KRI Tanjung Fatagar (974)) was granted to Indonesian Navy in 2004. KM Kerinci was sold in 2014. KFC Jetliner was rented to Sri Lanka Navy between 2009 and 2012. As of 2017, no party is interested to buy KM Ganda Dewata (Ro-ro ship) even as scrap.

Pelni started to reform its services and management since 2012 to this day, by focusing more on tourism and cargo market, alongside improving its current low-budget passenger services. Pelni began to book positive earnings since 2014.

Ships and services

Passenger ships 
Pelni's passenger ships are also a major branding feature of Pelni: large yellow funnel with red-and-white strips and Pelni logo. Pelni painted its ships with white color on the upper side of ships and crimson on the lower side. Its reddish lifeboats are also easily recognised from distances.

Most of these passenger ships (excluding KM Egon, KM Ganda Dewata & KFC Jetliner) were built by Meyer Werft, a major German shipyard well known as luxury passenger ships builder. Due to this, some considered Pelni's ships 'too good' by Indonesian standards, even after designed & built as economy-class passenger ships by default. As of August 12, 2017, no Meyer-built Pelni ship has ever sunk. However, these high-standard ships were not enjoyed by passengers, especially prior to 2014, because of harsh treatment by passengers and the crew itself. Most of the problems come from illegal passengers, which at least until April 24, 2019 are still frequently found.

Since 2014 onwards, some improvements have been made. Online booking was made available, but still limited to payment via Bank Rakyat Indonesia's ATM and Indomaret store. Credit card payment is still not possible. Toilet facilities were improved, and 2-pin electric sockets were installed. GSM & GPRS networks on Pelni ships are provided by telkomsel. However, passenger management is still troublesome, mainly because most of Indonesian seaport's passenger terminals (operated by Indonesia Port Corporations) are not sterile from illegal visitors.

Below is a list of Pelni's Passenger Ships. All of these ships (excluding KFC Jetliner) were named after mountains in Indonesia. KM Tatamailau however, is named after Mt. Tatamailau in East Timor. KM is an abbreviation of 'Kapal Mesin', meaning Motor Vessel (MV) and KFC is an abbreviation of 'Kapal Ferry Cepat', meaning Fast Ferry Ship.

Facilities 
 One single bed per passenger, but shared space with others and no barriers between beds.
 2-pin electric plugs per bed (low voltage, for mobile phones only)
 Shared bathrooms & toilets with hot and cold water
 Three standard meals a day
 Hot water for making drinks
 Musalla
 Cafeteria
Shop
 Smoking area
 GSM and GPRS network by Telkomsel
 Clinic

Facilities (KM Kelud only) 
KM Kelud (serving Jakarta-Batam-Tanjung Balai Karimun-Medan) is the ship with most complete facilities:
 Restaurant
 Wi-Fi (paid)
 Mini cinema
 Alfamart and Pelnimart store
 Gym
 Live music
KM Kelud also provides first- and 2nd-class service in addition to economy-class services, with double bedroom and four single-bedroom options, with television and better food menus.

However, not all of those facilities are always available. Some passengers wrote that access to some of those, such as mini-cinema and gym were blocked by the crew. Some facilities, especially the toilets, are in poor condition. The ships are also often overcrowded by illegal passengers, especially after embarking from smaller ports where security is lax.

Tourism services 

In addition to regular passenger routes, Pelni provides tourism packages to various islands. Pelni introduces live-on-board concept, where Pelni ships will pick up passenger in hub ports (such as Semarang or Sorong), sail to destined tourist attraction, stay there as 'floating hotel' while passengers enjoying the tourism packages in nearby islands, and then return to hub port. For 2017, the tourism packages are:
 Karimunjava Islands (depart from Semarang)
 Raja Ampat Islands (from Sorong)
 Derawan Islands (from Balikpapan)
 Wakatobi National Park (from Baubau)
 Komodo National Park (from Labuan Bajo)
 Banda Neira (from Ambon)

On 23 June 2019, Pelni launched new tourism service with KLM (Kapal Layar Mesin/Motor Sail Ship) Pelita Arunika, a pinisi ship. Built by a traditional shipbuilder in Tanjung Bira, South Sulawesi and serving tourists in Labuan Bajo.

Cargo ships 
KM Caraka Jaya Niaga III-4
KM Caraka Jaya Niaga III-2
KM Caraka Jaya Niaga III-32
KM Logistik Nusantara 1
KM Logistik Nusantara 2
KM Logistik Nusantara 3
KM Logistik Nusantara 4
KM Logistik Nusantara 5

Other ships

Tol Laut ships 

Tol Laut (literally "Sea Toll (Road)" or "Sea Highway") is a maritime program by President Joko Widodo to improve Indonesian logistic system through providing routine and subsidized cargo sailing across Indonesia. As of 2019, Pelni operated 7 cargo ships for this purpose.

Cattle ship    
Pelni operated one cattle ship, KM Camara Nusantara I, to transport cattle produced by farmers in Lesser Sunda Islands to Java.

Perintis ships 
Perintis (pioneer) services are routes served by smaller ships (below 500 passengers) connecting smaller islands to regional cities. these services are subsidized by the Government of Indonesia. It is intended to increase accessibility and decrease logistic cost among small islands. These routes are less regular than those served by the main passenger ships, thus online ticket booking is not available. Tickets can be bought at the port of departure or its nearest branch offices. Perintis schedules can also be accessed through Pelni call center and social media upon request. As of 2019, Pelni owned and operated 53 perintis ships, serving 46 routes.

International Routes 
During Indonesian occupation of East Timor, Pelni served the port of Dili, which stopped after 1999. In 2000, Pelni also served Bitung-Davao (Philippines) route for a short period.

Incidents and accidents 
 On January 27, 1981, Pelni's ship KMP Tampomas II was burned and sank near Masalembu Islands in the Java Sea while sailing from Port of Tanjung Priok, Jakarta to Makassar. This ship was built in 1956 by Mitsubishi Heavy Industries and was planned to be scrapped but was sold to Pelni instead. Officials reported 431 people were killed. Iwan Fals and Ebiet G. Ade wrote songs about the sinking.
 On April 6, 2011, KM Fudi rolled over while being repaired in PT. PAL shipyard in Surabaya. Due to lack of funds, Pelni & PAL decided to abandon the ship and allowed Yala Gada, a cooperative from Indonesian Navy to scrap her on March 15, 2016.

Gallery

References

External links

 Pelni – official site
 Online schedule of all Pelni ships available here
 Travels on Pelni, (PT Pelayaran Nasional Indonesia) – review of a voyage on KM Kelud by Jonathan Boonzaier in Maritime Matters
 YouTube- Making of KM Lambelu in Meyer Werft
Pelni Schedule - The Sheep Schedule for Pelni

Shipping companies of Indonesia
Government-owned companies of Indonesia
1952 establishments in Indonesia
Indonesia transport-related lists